The Magnani-Rocca Foundation is a private collection of old masters and modern art, gathered by the art collector and critic Luigi Magnani. He established the foundation in 1978 honour of his father Giuseppe and his mother Eugenia Rocca to promote art, music and literary activities, though it was only from 1983 that he displayed his art collection to the public. It is housed in the Villa Magnani on via Fondazione Magnani Rocca 4 in Mamiano, a district of Traversetolo in the Province of Parma.

The collection includes works by Gentile da Fabriano, Albrecht Dürer, Vittore Carpaccio, Titian, Rubens, Van Dyck, Francisco Goya, Claude Monet, Auguste Renoir, Paul Cézanne, Giorgio Morandi (50 works), Giorgio de Chirico, Filippo de Pisis, Gino Severini, Alberto Burri, Johann Heinrich Füssli, Nicolas de Staël, Lippo di Dalmasio, Filippo Lippi, Domenico Ghirlandaio, Lorenzo Costa, Martin Schongauer as well as sculptures by Antonio Canova and Lorenzo Bartolini.

Sources
http://www.magnanirocca.it/

References

Museums in Parma
Art museums and galleries in Italy